Carlitos is a Spanish or Portuguese nickname (usually a diminutive for Carlos). It may refer to:

Persons

 Carlitos (footballer, born 1921) (1921–2001), former Brazilian football striker
 Carlitos (footballer, born 1976), full name Carlos Domínguez Domínguez, Spanish retired footballer
 Carlitos (footballer, born 1977), full name Carlos Manuel da Silva Cunha, Portuguese former football winger
 Carlitos (footballer, born 1981), full name Carlos Pereira Rodrigues, Portuguese football defender
 Carlitos (footballer, born 1982), full name Carlos Alberto Alves Garcia, Portuguese football winger
 Carlitos (footballer, born March 1985), full name Juan Carlos Moreno Rojo, Spanish football midfielder
 Carlitos (footballer, born April 1985), full name Carlos Emanuel Soares Tavares, Cape Verdean football defender
 Carlitos (footballer, born July 1985), full name João Carlos Dias Correia, Portuguese footballer 
 Carlitos (footballer, born 1988), full name Carlos Miguel Gomes de Almeida, Angolan footballer
 Carlitos (footballer, born 1990), full name Carlos Daniel López Huesca, Spanish footballer
 Carlitos (footballer, born 1993), full name Carlos Miguel Tavares Oliveira, Portuguese football winger
 Carlos Arroyo (born 1979), Puerto Rican basketball player
 Carlos Balá (1925–2022), Argentine actor who specialized in children's entertainment
 Carlos Chimomole (born 1984), Mozambican football midfielder
 Carlos Colón Sr. (born 1948), Puerto Rican professional wrestler
 Carlos Gardel (1890–1935), Argentine Tango singer
 Carlos Páez Rodríguez (born 1953), survivor in the "Cordillera de los Andes" disaster
 Carlos Tevez (born 1984), Argentine football striker
 Carlos Alcaraz (born 2003), Spanish tennis player

Carlos Sainz Jr. (born 1994), Formula 1 driver — nicknamed by family and friends

Fictional
 The Tramp, a Charlie Chaplin character
 Carlitos Casagrande, a character from the animated series The Casagrandes

See also
Carlito (name)
Callitos Lopez